Kavirat District is a district (bakhsh) in Aran va Bidgol County, Isfahan Province, Iran. At the 2006 census, its population was 12,811, in 3,332 families.  The District has one city: Abuzeydabad. The District has two rural districts (dehestan): Kavir Rural District and Kavirat Rural District.

References 

Aran va Bidgol County
Districts of Isfahan Province